Jordi Caballero (born February 5, 1965) is a Spanish actor, dancer, pianist, reality show personality, choreographer, writer, and producer for stage, film, and television. He is a member of the Producers Guild of America, SAG-AFTRA, Actors' Equity Association, and ASCAP. Caballero received a Best Supporting Actor nomination at the 2003 Method Fest Independent Film Festival for his role as Captain Madrid in the film I Witness co-starring James Spader and Jeff Daniels. He has also been a two-time American Choreography Award nominee. As an actor, Caballero is known for portraying characters of Spanish, Italian and Euro-Mediterranean descent. Most recently he played Eugenio Martínez in the limited television series Gaslit starring Julia Roberts and Sean Penn.

Early career
Caballero’s love for the American way led him to the U.S. to pursue a career in acting and the performing arts. He earned a BFA in acting at New York University, Tisch School of the Arts. During this period, he also cultivated his evolving interests in dance/performance art including theatrical and Latin styles. It was not long after that Caballero’s multiple talents as an actor, dancer, and choreographer brought him work in television, film and stage venues.

Acting career
One of Caballero’s first major television appearances was as a love interest to the character of Carrie Bradshaw on the HBO show Sex & The City. Several roles followed on shows such as Alias, Scrubs, CSI: Miami, The Unit, Nip/Tuck, The Shield, Entourage, Brothers & Sisters, Rules of Engagement and Justified.

The romantic comedy Snow Days starring Bernadette Peters marked the beginning of Caballero’s film career. He has brought his combination of acting and movement talents to bear in such high-profile films as Alex & Emma, Rent, and Pirates of the Caribbean: The Curse of the Black Pearl.

In 2007, he was an associate producer and co-star of Valentina’s Tango, opposite celebrated tango master Guillermina Quiroga.

In 2022, he appeared in 4 episodes of the limited television series Gaslit starring Julia Roberts and Sean Penn. Caballero plays Eugenio Martínez, one of the five men recruited to execute the Watergate burglary.

Dance and choreography
Caballero has worked for musical artists such as Cher, Madonna, Usher, Tony Bennett, Macy Gray and Jane’s Addiction among many others. In 2008 he choreographed for the Return of the Spice Girls tour. In 2018 and 2019 Caballero toured as a guest artist with Andrea Bocelli.

In 2021, Caballero danced as Camila Cabello's father in the music video for Don't Go Yet, choreographed the latin segment of Ed Sheeran's music video Shivers, and performed as a conductor who dances at his music stand in a widely-aired commercial for Toyota.

Several television shows have called on Caballero’s talents. In 2006 he performed for The 78th Annual Academy Awards. In 2006 and then 2009 he performed on Dancing with the Stars. He has also appeared as a choreographer and guest judge on Bravo’s Step It Up and Dance in 2008, and worked on Dirty Dancing: The Time of Your Life for UK television. In 2019 he was the Supervising Choreographer for the season premiere of Dancing with the Stars.

Writing
Caballero has lent his writing talents to several projects, including Tinder Tango, the World Choreography Awards, and the documentary El último hit analógico: Macarena.

His play Ghost Town was a finalist in the 2022 Brisk Festival L.A.

Producing
Over the past several years Caballero has emerged as a producer of original entertainment, including Tango Shalom, Tango Mania, A Perfect Vintage, The Last Analog Hit: Macarena, La Carga, After the Rain, Dancing For My Havana, and the World Choreography Awards.

Composing
Trained in the classical music arts and piano at the age of 8 at the Municipal conservatory of Barcelona, Caballero has produced, composed, and licensed his music for several TV shows and films, including Step It Up and Dance.

His original music includes such compositions as The Music Box, Soledad y Esperanza, Lagrimas,  and Conversaciones.

Filmography

Film

Television

Videogames

References

External links
 
 
 
 Jordi Caballero at TVGuide.com

Male film actors from Catalonia
Male stage actors from Catalonia
Place of birth missing (living people)
1965 births
Male television actors from Catalonia
Living people
Participants in American reality television series
Male dancers from Catalonia